Merkaz Yael is a community settlement in the Ta'anakh region in northern Israel. It belongs to the Gilboa Regional Council.

History
The village was founded in 1960 as part of the program to inhabit the Ta'anakh region.  It formed a regional center for the nearby communities Prazon, Avital, and Meitav.

The name "Merkaz Yael" was inspired by Yael (Judges 4:17), the hero of the battle against Sisera in the Book of Judges and wife of Hever the Kenite, after whom another community settlement nearby is named (Merkaz Hever).  This battle took place in the nearby region.

References

Community settlements
Populated places in Northern District (Israel)
1960 establishments in Israel
Populated places established in 1960